Staroyezhovo is a rural locality (a village) in Berezovsky Selsoviet, Birsky District, Bashkortostan, Russia. The population was 89 as of 2010. There are 9 streets.

Geography 
Staroyezhovo is located 37 km southwest of Birsk (the district's administrative centre) by road. Pechenkino is the nearest rural locality.

References 

Rural localities in Birsky District